Telmo may refer to:

People
 Saint Telmo (died 303), also known as Erasmus of Formia, Christian martyr and saint
 Pedro González Telmo (1190-1246), Castilian friar and priest
 Luis Telmo Paz y Miño (1884-1962), President of the Supreme Military Junta of Ecuador
 Telmo Vargas (1912-2013), Ecuadorian Chief of Staff of the Armed Forces of Ecuador
 Telmo Zarra (1921-2006), Spanish football forward
 Telmo Pires (born 1953), American soccer defender
 Telmo Languiller (born 1957), Australian politician
 Telmo Aldaz de la Quadra-Salcedo (born 1970), Spanish globetrotter and media personality
 Telmo Pinto (born 1971), Portuguese midfielder
 Telmo (Brazilian footballer) (born 1975), full name Telmo Além da Silva, Brazilian football left-back
 Telmo Castanheira (born 1992), Portuguese football midfielder
 Telmo Arcanjo (born 2001), Cape Verdean football midfielder

Places
 San Telmo Island, an island of the coast of Antarctica named after the ship
 Isla San Telmo, an island off the coast of Panama
 Palace of San Telmo, a historical edifice in Seville, Spain
 Sant Elm, a town in Andratx, Mallorca known as San Telmo in Castilian
 San Telmo, Baja California, a city in Mexico
 San Telmo, Buenos Aires, a barrio in Argentina
 Club Atlético San Telmo, an association football club in the San Telmo barrio
 Feria de San Telmo, an antique fair in the San Telmo barrio
 Visita de San Telmo, a mission station in Baja California, Mexico
 San Telmo Museoa, museum of Basque society in Donostia, Spain

Other uses
 San Telmo (ship), Spanish 18th century ship
 The Santelmo (St. Elmo's Fire) is a creature of Philippine mythology

See also
 San Telmo (disambiguation)
 Elmo (disambiguation)